In inorganic chemistry, the trispyrazolylborate ligand, abbreviated Tp−, is an anionic tridentate and tripodal ligand.  Trispyrazolylborate refers specifically to the anion [HB(C3N2H3)3]−, but the term trispyrazolylborate refers to derivatives substituted at on the pyrazolyl rings. This family of compounds are sometimes called scorpionate ligands.

Tp ligands

As suggested by the resonance structures, the nitrogen centers that are not bonded to boron are basic. These centers bind to three adjacent sites of a metal such that the simple adducts have C3v symmetry.  The facial bonding mode is reminiscent of cyclopentadienyl ligands, although the ligand field stabilization energy of Tp− is weaker as indicated by the fact that Fe(Tp)2 is a spin-crossover complex whereas ferrocene is low-spin.

The Tp ligands are usually prepared from the reaction of pyrazole with potassium borohydride:

KBH4  +  3 C3H3N2H   →  K[HB(C3N2H3)3]  + 3H2

Intermediates include the monopyrazolylborate ([H3B(C3N2H3)]−) and the bispyrazolylborate ([H2B(C3N2H3)2]−). KTp (m.p. 188-189 °C) is a colourless solid that soluble in polar solvents.

Substituted tris(pyrazolylborate)s
Condensation of 3-substituted pyrazoles with borohydride affords the corresponding substituted Tp derivatives.  The substituent forces boron to the less hindered nitrogen center.  Thus 3-phenylpyrazole gives HB(C3N2H2Ph)3]−, abbreviated [TpPh]−, wherein the phenyl substituents project away from the metal. Analogously 3-isopropylpyrazole gives HB(C3N2H2iPr)3]-, abbreviated [TpiPr]−.  3,5-Dimethylpyrazole gives the hexamethylated ligand [HB(C3N2HMe2)3]−, sometimes called Tp*−.  Because pyrazoles are readily prepared from 1,3-diketones, a large number of substituted Tp complexes are possible.  Derivatives are known with perfluorinated, chiral, and functional substituents.

Examples

Illustrative of the synthetic routes to TpR− complexes, MnBr(CO)5 and KTp react as follows:
MnBr(CO)5  +  KTp   →   TpMn(CO)3  +  KBr  +  2 CO
Electronically related compounds are known, such as CpMn(CO)3 and [(9-ane-S3)Mn(CO)3]+. The labile acetonitrile complex Mo(CO)3(MeCN)3 reacts with KTp to give the anion [MoTp(CO)3]−, which can be crystallised as its tetraethylammonium salt (see figure):
Mo(CO)3(CH3CN)3  +  KTp   →   K[TpMo(CO)3]  +  3 CH3CN
Protonation, allylation, and nitrosylation of this salt gives the corresponding neutral hydride, allyl, and nitrosyl (see figure) derivatives.

The inductive effect of substituents on the pyrazolyl groups is illustrated by the values of νCO for TpCF3CuCO (2201 cm−1) vs TpMeCuCO (2137 cm−1).

Although of no practical value, trispyrazolylborate compounds have been applied to a variety of themes.  In bioinorganic chemistry, some of the first crystallizable copper dioxygen complexes were obtained using this ligand platform, including examples of the Cu2(μ-η2,η2-O2) bonding mode. Models for hemerythrin, an enzyme with a diiron active site, and xanthine oxidase, a molybdoenzyme, have been examined.  In such model complexes, the Tp− simulates the coordination environment provided by three imidazole ligands in proteins.

In organometallic chemistry, Tp*Rh(CO)2 and related complexes participate in C-H activation reactions.

Derivatives of Grignard reagents can be generated, such as TpiBuMgCH3.

See also

 Trisoxazolinylborate

References

Organoboron compounds
Tripodal ligands